Newton Emerson (born 1969) is a political commentator from Portadown in Northern Ireland, and now lives in Belfast. He described himself as a 'liberal unionist' in 2001. He contributes to both the Sunday Times, and The Irish News as well as The Irish Times.

He first came to prominence as writer of the "Portadown News" website, similar to American publication, "The Onion", poking fun at both sides of the political divide.
 
Emerson was forced to leave his job at a computer company, but maintained the website until 2005. In 2008, he presented the documentary, Lost City of Craigavon, which was broadcast on the BBC.

References

Date of birth missing (living people)
Living people
British political commentators
Satirists from Northern Ireland
Journalists from Northern Ireland
Columnists from Northern Ireland
People from Portadown
People educated at Portadown College
British social commentators
Male non-fiction writers from Northern Ireland
1969 births